Awake is the tenth album by L'Arc-en-Ciel, released on June 22, 2005, in Japan and on September 20, 2005, in the United States. The song "Lost Heaven" was used as the ending theme of the Fullmetal Alchemist the Movie: Conqueror of Shamballa film.

Track listing

Personnel
 hyde – vocals, guitar on track 13
 ken – guitar, backing vocals, keyboards on tracks 3, 7, 8, 11 and 12, tambourine on tracks 1 and 3
 tetsu – bass guitar, backing vocals, keyboards on tracks 4 and 9, guitar on track 4
 yukihiro – drums, keyboards on track 1, scratching on track 6, synthesizer on track 7
 Hiroaki Sugawara – keyboards on track 2
 Hajime Okano – keyboards on tracks 4, 6, 7, 8, 9, 11 and 12, autoharp on track 9, shaker on track 11
 Hitoshi Saitou – keyboards on tracks 6, 7 and 10
 Rie Eto – female backing vocals on track 8
 Atsushi Koike – keyboards on track 10
 Hal-Oh Togashi – acoustic piano on track 10
 Jun Miyake – flugelhorn on track 10
 Takeshi Hidano – keyboards and synthesizer on track 13
 Jeremy Lubbock – conductor
 Charles Bisharat, Darius Campo, Joel Derouin, Armen Garabedian, Berj Garabedian, Patricia Johnson, Peter Kent, Miran Kojian, Anatoly Rosinsky, Shari Zippert – violin on track 3
 Marilyn Baker, Denyse Buffum, James Ross, Evan Wilson – viola on track 3
 Larry Corbett, Emie Ehrhardt, Suzie Katayama, Dan Smith – cello on track 3
 Earle Dumler – oboe on track 3

References

2005 albums
L'Arc-en-Ciel albums
Tofu Records albums